Acrolepiopsis chirapanthui is a moth of the family Acrolepiidae. It was described by Sigeru Moriuti in 1984. It is found in Thailand (the Chiang Mai Province).

The wingspan is about 9 mm. The forewings are brownish-ochreous with scattered black and whitish scales. The hindwings are pale, becoming paler towards the base.

References

Moths described in 1984
Acrolepiidae